Jae-gyu, also spelled Jae-kyu or Jae-kyoo, is a Korean unisex given name. Its meaning differs based on the hanja used to write each syllable of the name. There are 20 hanja with the reading "jae" and 20 hanja with the reading "gyu" on the South Korean government's official list of hanja which may be registered for use in given names.

People with this name include:
Kim Jae-gyu (1926–1980), South Korean Army Lieutenant General who assassinated Park Chung-hee
Lee Jae-kyoo (born 1970), South Korean director
Park Jae-kyu, president of Kyungnam University in Masan

See also
List of Korean given names
Kang Je-gyu (born 1962), South Korean director

References

Korean unisex given names